is a Japanese actress, voice actress and narrator formerly affiliated with Theater Echo and now with 81 Produce. Following her debut in Shiroi Kiba: White Fang Monotagari as the role of Mary Scott, Katsuki has lent her voice to several notable anime, Japanese-dubbed films and TV series, games, drama CDs, narration, and commercials. Some of her best-known roles include: Maria Von Trapp in Trapp Family Story, Reccoa Londe in Zeta Gundam, Maya Kitajima in Glass Mask, Masuyo Ikari in High School! Kimengumi, Michiru Kaioh/Sailor Neptune in Sailor Moon and Tsunade in Naruto.

Filmography

Anime

Films

Video games

Tokusatsu

Drama CDs

Overseas dubbing

Other

Discography
 Albums
 Ame ha suki desu ka (雨は好きですか)
 Character albums and songs
 Sayonara no Daimeshi (さよならの代名詞) (Yoroiden Samurai Troopers, BEST FRIENDS CD)

References

External links
 Official agency profile 
 
 

1958 births
Living people
People from Hachinohe
Voice actresses from Aomori Prefecture
Japanese video game actresses
Japanese voice actresses
20th-century Japanese actresses
21st-century Japanese actresses
81 Produce voice actors